The following is a list of association football clubs and their affiliates, past and present. Teams may have a feeder club for a number of reasons, including the ability to loan out inexperienced youngsters, to allow young, foreign players to gain a work permit, or for business purposes, such as merchandising. In English football the operation of an external feeder team is prohibited, and so the agreements are more informal, and usually between local teams.

Belgium

K.S.K. Beveren (club defunct)

 ASEC Mimosas (defunct)

Colombia

Atlético Nacional
 Alianza Petrolera

Santa Fe
 Patriotas

Millonarios F.C.
 Valledupar F.C.

Croatia

Dinamo Zagreb
 NK Lokomotiva
 NK Radnik Sesvete

Czech Republic

1. SC Znojmo
 FC Slovan Rosice

FK Baník Most
 Arsenal Česká Lípa

FK Bohemians Prague (Střížkov)
 SK Viktorie Jirny

FK Teplice
 SK Roudnice nad Labem

SK Dynamo České Budějovice
 SK Strakonice 1908 (defunct)

SK Sigma Olomouc
 FK SAN-JV Šumperk

England

Arsenal F.C.

 ASEC Mimosas
 K.S.K. Beveren (club defunct)
 Colorado Rapids
 Inverness CT

Blackburn Rovers F.C.

 Cercle Brugge K.S.V.

Bradford City A.F.C.

 Royal Racing FC Montegnee (defunct)

Bolton Wanderers F.C.

 Ballymena United (defunct)
 Elche CF
 Wuhan Huanghelou (defunct)

Charlton Athletic F.C.

 ASEC Mimosas
 K.F.C. Germinal Beerschot (defunct)
 MyPa
 Shanghai United F.C (defunct)

Chelsea
 LA Galaxy
 PSV Eindhoven
 Vitesse

Crystal Palace
 Crystal Palace Baltimore (defunct)

Leeds United
 Glenavon F.C.
 Cultural Leonesa
 Atlético Astorga
 K.A.S. Eupen
 Aspire Academy

Liverpool
 K.R.C. Genk

Manchester City
 Girona FC (from August 2017)
 Aarhus (defunct)
 Bangor City
 Black Aces F.C. (defunct)
 BK Häcken (defunct)
 Chonburi FC (defunct)
 Djurgårdens IF (defunct)
 Gil Vicente (defunct)
 Grasshopper Club Zürich (defunct)
 Hyde (defunct)
 KV Mechelen (defunct)
 NEC Nijmegen (defunct)
 New York City F.C.
 Melbourne City FC
 Perth Glory (defunct)
 Sporting CP
 Shanghai Shenhua (defunct)
 Strømsgodset IF (defunct)
 Thanda Royal Zulu (defunct)

Manchester United
 Connah's Quay Nomads F.C.
Desportivo Brasil
 F.C. Twente
 Fluminense Football Club
 Manglerud Star Toppfotball
 Parramatta Eagles (defunct)
 IF Brommapojkarna (defunct)
 Livingston F.C.
 Newport County A.F.C.
 Royal Antwerp FC
 Shelbourne F.C.
 Walsall F.C.
 Western Province United

Nottingham Forest F.C.
 Crumlin United F.C.

Norwich City F.C. 

  Tampa Bay Rowdies
  Coritiba
  UD Las Palmas

Preston North End
 Holker Old Boys F.C.

Sheffield United
 Chengdu Blades (defunct)
 White Star Woluwé F.C.

Stoke City
 Orlando City SC

Sunderland
 Asante Kotoko
 El-Ittihad El-Iskandary 
 Bidvest Wits F.C.
 D.C. United
 Lierse S.K.

Tottenham Hotspur
 Supersport United
 South China AA
 San Jose Earthquakes
 Tallahassee Tottenham Hotspur F.C.
  Internacional

West Ham United
 Ifeanyi Ubah F.C.

Wolverhampton Wanderers
 Grasshopper Club Zürich
 Truganina Hornets Soccer Club

France

Monaco
 Cercle Brugge

Indonesia

Persib Bandung
 Bandung United

Italy

Bologna FC 1909
 CF Montréal

Mexico

Pachuca
 Colorado Rapids

Netherlands

Ajax
 Ajax Cape Town -relationship ended
 Almere City

FC Twente
 Dayton Dutch Lions
  FK Qarabağ - relationship now ended.

Feyenoord
 SBV Excelsior
 Feyenoord Ghana

New Zealand

Wellington Phoenix
 Team Wellington

Portugal

S.L. Benfica
 F.C. Alverca
 Zagłębie Lubin defunct

Scotland

Aberdeen
 Atlanta United FC

Celtic
 KV Oostende (defunct)
 Santos Laguna

Heart of Midlothian
 FBK Kaunas

Hibernian
 Charleston Battery
 Stenhousemuir F.C.
 Brighton & Hove Albion F.C.

Inverness CT
 Arsenal

Rangers
 HSV

St Mirren
 Birkenhead United (from June 2021)
 Nelson Suburbs (from June 2021)

Motherwell
 Sorrento Soccer Club

Spain

Atlético Madrid
 Shenhua FC
 Atletico Ottawa
 Atletico San Luis

Athletic Bilbao
 CD Basconia

Eibar
 CD Vitoria

Mallorca
 Real Cartagena

Osasuna
 CD Iruña

Sevilla FC
 Sevilla FC Juncos

Sweden

IFK Norrköping
 IF Sylvia
 Husqvarna FF

Turkey

Galatasaray
 Alania Vladikavkaz
 Güneştepespor
 Reading F.C.
 Beylikgücüspor
 KSV Hessen Kassel
 SG Wattenscheid

See also
Reserve team

References

Feeder